The Florida Blacktips were a professional American football team, operating as a traveling team. They were a charter member of the Fall Experimental Football League, which was trying to become the developmental league for the National Football League.  They were to play their home games at FIU Stadium in Miami, also the home to the FIU Panthers football and track and field teams. However, it was announced on September 22, 2014, that the Blacktips would drop 'Florida' from its name and play a truncated road schedule of only three games.  The Blacktips' inaugural season began on October 15, 2014. They finished the 2014 season in last place at 0–3.

On September 18, 2014, the Blacktips announced the signing of former Clemson quarterback Tajh Boyd, however Boyd never played for the Blacktips, moving to the Boston Brawlers before the season started.

The team was initially expected to permanently settle in a market it will share with an unspecified New York–Penn League baseball team for the 2015 season. However, a later announcement indicated the Blacktips would return in the same traveling-team status it held in 2014, solely owned and operated by the league. The team later quietly re-added the "Florida" portion back to its name. The Blacktips were unusual among FXFL teams in that it did not rely on NFL preseason castoffs for the majority of its roster (indeed, an article in The New York Times described the Blacktips as having "no set roster"). Its players were also paid significantly less than the other FXFL franchises, receiving only $300 for each of the two games that were played as opposed to the $1000 per game payout of the other teams.

The FXFL, and thus the Blacktips as well, suspended operations on September 2, 2016.

There are now rumblings going on at press time that former FXFL commissioner Brain Woods is considering bringing the Blacktips or the Brooklyn Bolts back to play in an indoor league and is eyeing the Arena Football League, National Arena League, Champions Indoor Football or Indoor Football League. The team's logo, colors and shark motif were recycled for The Spring League's fall 2020 season, albeit with the team rebranded as the "Blues."

Final roster

References

External links

 Official FXFL website
 Official Twitter page

 
2014 establishments in Florida
2016 disestablishments in Florida